The Tomb of Yue Fei is the mausoleum for the Southern Song dynasty general Yue Fei set in the southern foot of Qixia Hill, near the West Lake. See Yue Fei Temple.

History 

General Yue Fei (1103–1142) was a hero of the Southern Song Dynasty who fought against Jin invaders during the Jurchen campaigns against the Song Dynasty. Yue Fei was framed and murdered for crimes he did not commit. In 1163, Song Emperor Xiaozong exonerated Yue Fei and his corpse was reburied at the present site.

Layout  

On the left of the tomb of Yue Fei, is the tomb of his son, Yue Yun (岳雲). Before Yue Fei's tomb there are four cast-iron figures, with chests bare and hands bound behind their backs, facing the tomb and kneeling. They are Qin Hui and his wife Wang, as well as Zhang Jun and Mo Qi Xie; they are Yue Fei's murderers. On both sides of the road to the tombs are galleries. In the northern gallery are tablets inscribed with poems and his memorials to emperor. While in the southern one are tablets inscribed with poems composed by famous people in all successive dynasties.

See also

Media about Yue Fei
History of the Song Dynasty
Jurchen campaigns against the Song Dynasty
Timeline of the Jurchen campaigns against the Song Dynasty
Yue Fei Temple

References 

Buildings and structures completed in 1163
Mausoleums in China
Buildings and structures in Hangzhou
Yue Fei
Major National Historical and Cultural Sites in Zhejiang
Song dynasty architecture